Tina: The Tina Turner Musical is a jukebox musical featuring the music of Tina Turner and depicting her life from her humble beginnings in Nutbush, Tennessee, to her transformation into a rock 'n roll star. Directed by Phyllida Lloyd with a book by Katori Hall, Frank Ketelaar, and Kees Prins, the musical had its world premiere on 17 April 2018 at the Aldwych Theatre in London. The Broadway production opened on 7 November 2019.

Development
On 16 December 2016 a workshop presentation was held with Tina Turner in attendance, announcing that a biographical musical about Tina's life had been in development by Stage Entertainment for over a year. The creative team of the musical consists of Katori Hall, with Frank Ketelaar and Kees Prins as writers of the book, Phyllida Lloyd as the director, Mark Thompson as set and costume designer, Anthony van Laast as choreographer and Nicholas Skilbeck as musical supervisor. Frank Ketelaar and Kees Prins wrote the early draft of the book, with Katori Hall taking over partway through development.

Productions
The show began previews on 21 March 2018 at the Aldwych Theatre, officially opened on 17 April. Adrienne Warren played the title role, with Jenny Fitzpatrick alternating in the role in some performances. The production was nominated for three Laurence Olivier Awards, including Best Musical. After Warren's departure, the title role has been played by Nkeki Obi-Melekwe, Aisha Jawando, and Elesha Paul Moses.

In March 2019, the show opened at the Stage Operettenhaus in Hamburg, Germany.

The show began on Broadway in previews at the Lunt-Fontanne Theatre on 12 October 2019 and officially opened on 7 November 2019. Warren reprised the title role in the Broadway production, with direction by Phyllida Lloyd and choreography by Anthony van Laast. The show was suspended on 12 March 2020 due to the COVID-19 pandemic and resumed performances on 8 October 2021. In June 2022, it was announced that the production is slated to close on 14 August 2022 after 27 previews and 482 regular performances.

On 9 February 2020, the show opened at the Beatrix theater in Utrecht, the Netherlands. After the suspension of the show a little more than a month after its opening, performances resumed on 14 July 2021.

A Spanish production ran from 30 September 2021 to January 8 2023 at the Teatro Coliseum in Madrid.

On 11 September 2022, the show will embark on a North American Tour opening at the Providence Performing Arts Center (PPAC) in Providence, Rhode Island, before visiting 40 cities in its first year.

In March 2023, the German production will be transferred to the  Apollo Theater Stuttgart.

An Australian production will open at the Theatre Royal, Sydney in 2023.

Synopsis

Act I
The musical opens with Anna Mae Bullock's childhood in Nutbush Tennessee, where she sings exuberantly in the community church despite her mother Zelma's embarrassment at her loudness ("Nutbush City Limits"). Anna Mae's parents have a difficult relationship, which culminates in Zelma walking out with her eldest daughter Alline, leaving Anna Mae to be brought up by her grandmother, Gran Georgeanna.

Some years later, Anna Mae is invited to join Zelma and Alline in St Louis, and she goes with Gran Georgeanna's encouragement ("Don't Turn Around"). In St Louis, Alline introduces Anna Mae to the nightlife ("Shake a Tail Feather"), eventually crossing paths with Ike Turner and his band, the Kings of Rhythm ("The Hunter"). One night Anna Mae joins Ike on stage to sing ("Matchbox"), and the success of the performance leads Ike to ask Zelma for permission for Anna Mae to join his band ("It's Gonna Work Out Fine").

Ike gives Anna Mae the stage name "Tina Turner" despite her protests. Although Tina enjoys performing with him, she's aware of Ike's vicious temper ("A Fool in Love"), and has to hide her love affair with Raymond, a member of Ike's band ("Let's Stay Together"). After touring successfully for some time, Ike asks Tina to marry him, since people already think they are because of her stage name. Tina agrees, despite being pregnant with Raymond's child; in response, Raymond leaves her ("Better Be Good to Me"). Tina keeps performing with Ike and his band, through Ike's infidelities, violence, and demands of Tina's health despite her having another child ("I Want to Take You Higher"). Ike's road manager, Rhonda Graam advises Tina to leave him, but she refuses.

Ike gets a recording deal with Phil Spector, but is angered when he wants to record Tina solo ("River Deep Mountain High"). Ike is dismissive of Tina's ability as a solo artist, and during an argument attempts to hit her son, Craig. Tina almost walks out, but Ike apologises and begs her forgiveness ("Be Tender with Me Baby"). Tina overdoses and is sent to hospital, but is forced to check out for a performance ("Proud Mary"). Backstage, Tina and Ike get into another violent fight, which is the final straw and causes Tina to run away. Bruised and bleeding, she asks a hotel clerk for a room to stay, using only her stage name as a promise to pay later since she doesn't have any money ("I Don't Wanna Fight").

Act II
Tina, free from Ike, has been performing in Las Vegas with the help of Rhonda, now her manager. They're struggling to make ends meet because no record label wants to sign a black woman who's nearing forty years old, and Ike has claimed copyright over all songs from the "Ike & Tina Revue", preventing her from singing the songs she's known for ("Private Dancer"). While dropping off a demo tape at Capitol Records, they meet Roger Davies, a young Australian music producer who's a fan of Tina. Roger goes to Vegas to watch Tina perform ("Disco Inferno") and afterward asks to be her manager. Rhonda is upset about being put aside, but Tina insists that she needs to try something new, and that she needs Rhonda more as a sister than a manager ("Open Arms").

Tina travels to London for Roger's recording session. Among the people she meets is Erwin Bach, a German music executive. Tina wants to reinvent herself and transition to rock and roll, but she struggles with Roger's advice, and dreams of Ike watching her ("I Can't Stand the Rain"). Erwin visits her hotel room to provide comfort, and the pair kiss.

While preparing a performance showcase for the record label, Tina rails against Roger's instructions, refusing to be anyone's puppet any longer. Tina asks everyone to leave, and performs her Buddhist mantra to calm herself. She has a vision of her younger self and Gran Georgeanna encouraging her ("Tonight"). The showcase is a success, but the record label still refuses to sign her out of racism. Roger decides to promote her himself through touring performances back in the United States. Erwin asks her to stay in London and declares his love for her, but she rejects him. Tina's performance of the new material is a success ("What's Love Got to Do with It?"). Capitol Records begs her to sign with them, and she agrees only on her own terms.

Alline arrives with news Zelma is dying. Tina visits Zelma at the hospital, where Ike has been visiting Zelma as well. Zelma encourages them to reconcile; Tina demands that Ike apologise, but he can't and leaves. Zelma and Tina have an emotional confrontation, after which Zelma dies. Tina and Alline mourn their mother ("We Don't Need Another Hero (Thunderdome)").

Riding high, Tina prepares for a concert before 180,000 people in Brazil. Erwin arrives, having flown over to be with her. The pair reconcile, which leads into Tina's walking on stage for the concert ("The Best"). For the finale and encore, Tina and her band perform reprises of "Nutbush City Limits" and "Proud Mary".

Cast

Notable replacements 
West End
 Tina Turner: Nkeki Obi-Melekwe, Aisha Jawando, Elesha Paul Moses, Kristina Love
 Ike Turner: Ashley Zhangazha, Jammy Kasongo, Caleb Roberts

Broadway
 Tina Turner: Nkeki Obi-Melekwe
 Ike Turner: Nick Rashad Burroughs

Musical numbers

Act I
"Nutbush City Limits" (Tina Turner) - Richard, Young Tina and Company
"Don't Turn Around" (Albert Hammond, Diane Warren) - Tina, Gran Georgeanna and Company
"Shake a Tail Feather" (Otha Hayes, Verlie Rice, Andre Williams) - Alline, Tina, Ikettes and Company
"The Hunter" (Booker T. Jones, C. Wells, Al Jackson, Jr., Donald Dunn, Steve Cropper) - Ike and Ronnie
"Matchbox" (Ike Turner) - Ike, Tina and Company
"It's Gonna Work Out Fine" (Rose Marie McCoy, Sylvia McKinney) - Zelma, Ike, Tina, Alline, Ikettes and Company
"A Fool in Love" (I. Turner) - Tina and Ikettes
"Let's Stay Together" (Al Green, Willie Mitchell, Jackson) - Raymond and Tina
"Better Be Good to Me" (Holly Knight, Mike Chapman,  - Nicky Chinn)Tina and Company
"I Want to Take You Higher" (Sly Stone) - Tina, Alline and Ikettes
"River Deep Mountain High" (Phil Spector, Jeff Barry, Ellie Greenwich) - Tina and Company
"Be Tender with Me Baby" (Knight, Hammond,) - Ike, Tina, Alline, Ikettes, Ronnie and Richard
"Proud Mary" (John Fogerty) - Tina, Ike, Alline and Ikettes
"I Don't Wanna Fight" (Lulu, Billy Lawrie, Steve DuBerry) - Tina and Company

Act II
"Private Dancer" (Mark Knopfler) - Tina
"Disco Inferno" (Leroy Green, Ron Kersey) - Tina and Company
"Open Arms" (Martin Brammer, Colette van Sertima, Ben Barson) - Rhonda, Tina and Company
"I Can't Stand the Rain" (Ann Peebles, Don Bryant, Bernard Miller) - Tina, Ike and Company
"Tonight" (David Bowie, Iggy Pop) - Young Tina, Gran Georgeanna, Tina and Roger
"What's Love Got to Do with It?" (Terry Britten, Graham Lyle) - Tina, Ikettes, Ronnie and Raymond
"We Don't Need Another Hero (Thunderdome)" (Britten, Lyle) - Tina and Company
"The Best" (Knight, Chapman) - Tina and Company
"Finale: "Nutbush City Limits (Reprise)" (T. Turner) / Proud Mary (Reprise)" (Fogerty) - Company

 Songwriters in parenthesis

 In the Broadway production "Rocket 88" replaced "The Hunter" and "She Made My Blood Run Cold" was included after "Matchbox"

Critical reception
The musical received generally positive reviews from the critics, with particular praise reserved for Adrienne Warren in the title role as Tina Turner. Michael Billington of The Guardian described the "whirlwind performance" of Warren as "astonishing", and concluded on the production: "As bio-musicals go, this is as good as it gets." Similarly Dominic Cavendish of The Daily Telegraph described Warren's performance as a "tour de force" and considered the show "slickly choreographed, beautifully designed and roof-raisingly well-sung". Adam Mattera in Echoes noted "the production plays fast and loose with catalogue chronology... it's a crowd-pleasing decision meaning all the solo mega-hits aren't squeezed into the final act, but simultaneously it derails the dramatic reveal of Tina's 80s rock'n'roll reinvention," while concluding "it's so resounding joyous you don't care."

Will Gompertz of the BBC criticised the script as "rather disappointingly two-dimensional", but thought the musical "elegantly staged" with Warren a "24-carat, all singing, all dancing, bona fide star". Stephen Dalton of The Hollywood Reporter noted that while its grand finale contains "stilted, corny elements", "the production becomes a full-blooded rock show that is "roof-raising" and "life-affirming", with a climax that "swept the crowd to its feet. Pure button-pushing melodrama, maybe. But irresistibly uplifting entertainment, too."

Awards and nominations

Original West End production

Original Broadway production

References

External links

Internet Broadway database
Tina Turner Musical in Hamburg

Jukebox musicals
2018 musicals
Tina Turner
Tony Award-winning musicals
West End musicals